Operation Distant Plain was a series of non-nuclear explosive and detonable gas tests performed on test sites in Alberta, Canada, during the course of 1966 and 1967. Their purpose was to provide airblast, cratering, and ground shock data in summer and winter conditions for testing new prototype equipment, military targets and coniferous forest blowdown, and defoliation.

Participants included Canada, the United Kingdom, Australia, and the United States under the Tripartite Technical Cooperation Program. Detonable gas balloons were used in this operation in an attempt to find an economical substitute for TNT as well as for the fact that they could be placed at desired heights without a heavy support structure or towers. In addition, they were more adaptable to airblast phenomena and produced a well defined blast wave without perturbation or ejecta; they also produced no crater. However, it was found that they lacked the high pressure associated with high explosives, and difficulties were encountered as the 20-ton gas balloon ruptured and another detonated unexpectedly during inflation. Ultimately ANFO was elected as a lower cost alternative to TNT for non-nuclear explosives tests.

Tests
The following table summarizes the events that took place during the operation in chronological order.

References 

Explosions in Canada
Explosions in 1966
Explosions in 1967
1966 in Canada
1967 in Canada
Military projects of the United States
1966 in military history
1967 in military history
Distant Plain
Science and technology in Alberta
Events in Alberta
DRDC Suffield